Kancheli is a Georgian surname. Notable people with the surname include:

Giya Kancheli (1935–2019), Georgian composer
Nodar Kancheli (1938–2015), Russian architect

Georgian-language surnames